Dainava Forest also the Druskininkai-Varėna Forest, historically the Hrodna Forest, or the Belarusian Forest is the largest forest in Lithuania. A large part of the forest is protected by the Dzūkija National Park and the Čepkeliai Nature Reserve.

The Dainava Forest mainly consists of pine trees. There are some birch, spruce, black alder groves. Soils are sandy, light, densely covered by cup lichen. The forest is rich in edible mushrooms, billberries, cranberries, and cowberries. Collection of these mushrooms and berries are an important part of the local economy. The fauna includes many endangered species, such as the gray wolf, wood grouse, black grouse, hoopoe, Eurasian eagle-owl, osprey, mountain hare, stoat, Coronella austriaca, great capricorn beetle, and Lucanus cervus.

Most rivers belong to the basin of Merkys River, including the Ūla, Katra, Grūda, Varėnė, and Skroblus. These rivers are characterized by their clear, cold water, and numerous tributaries. Also, there are some tiny thermokarst lakes and bogs, including Čepkeliai Marsh, the largest bog in Lithuania.

Dainava Forest is the most sparsely populated region of Lithuania. Some of the villages were little affected by agricultural reforms and have preserved traditional Dzūkian folk architecture, which is now preserved as architecture monuments, destinations of rural tourism. These villages include Marcinkonys, Zervynos, Latežeris, Lynežeris, Dubininkas, Margionys, Musteika.

Gallery

References

Sources
 Dainavos giria. Tarybų Lietuvos enciklopedija, T. 1 (A-Grūdas). Vilnius, Vyriausioji enciklopedijų redakcija, 1985, 374 psl.

Forests of Lithuania
Alytus County
Varėna District Municipality
Druskininkai Municipality